The India national cricket team toured England from 22 June to 7 September 2014 for a five-match Test series, five One Day International matches and one Twenty20 International.

England won the Test series 3–1 and received the Pataudi Trophy. This was the first time since 1959 that India had played five Test matches on an England tour. The third Test, held at the Rose Bowl in Southampton, was the first Test match played in England to start on a Sunday.

Squads

Tour matches

Three-day: Leicestershire v Indians

Three-day: Derbyshire v Indians

One-day: Middlesex v Indians

Test series

1st Test

The 1st Test was a dull affair after the pitch proved to be difficult to bowl on. India won the toss and with the help of Murali Vijay's first century outside India and a 10th-wicket stand of 111 runs from Bhuvneshwar Kumar and Mohammed Shami, India scored 457. Alastair Cook's poor form with the bat continued and England were at 298/9 late on day 3, but a Test-record 198-run partnership between James Anderson and Joe Root for the final wicket helped them to a lead of 39 runs by the end of the innings. On the morning of the fifth day, some incisive bowling from England led to a possibility of a result. However, a half-century from Stuart Binny on his Test debut meant the match resulted in a draw, but not before Cook brought himself on to bowl, taking his maiden Test wicket in his second over.

At the end of the match, it was reported that India had complained against Anderson of physical abuse against Ravindra Jadeja at lunch on day 2, which led to level 3 charges being brought against Anderson and level 2 against Jadeja. The hearing was to be held on 22 July after the end of the 2nd Test. The charge against Jadeja was later reduced to level 1 and he was fined 50 percent of his match fee. The BCCI appealed against the fine and after a six-hour hearing over video conference, both players were found not guilty.

2nd Test

England inserted India on a green wicket and soon had them reeling at 145/7 in the second session of the match. However, a century by Ajinkya Rahane and a good knock by Bhuvneshwar Kumar led India to 295. England rode on Gary Ballance's second Test century to take a narrow lead. Fifties from Murali Vijay, Ravindra Jadeja and Bhuvneshwar Kumar in India's second innings meant England required 319 to win the Test. England captain Cook's poor form continued and England ended day 4 needing 209 runs with six wickets in hand. With the last ball before lunch on the final day, Ishant Sharma got Moeen Ali out to a bouncer; India continued to pepper England with relentless short-pitched bowling, and within an hour of play restarting, England were all out. After the match, England wicket-keeper Matt Prior announced that he would step down for the rest of the summer due to injury. This was India's first overseas Test win for three years.

3rd Test

This was the first Test match played in England to start on a Sunday. The third Test of the series was dominated by England right from the start. England posted a strong first-innings total, helped by centuries from Ian Bell and Ballance, combined with a quick debut half-century by Jos Buttler and a return to form for Cook, before they declared with 14 overs remaining on the second day. In India's first innings, all the batsmen got starts, but a failure to capitalise on them meant that England had a 229-run lead. Thanks to Cook and a quick-fire fifty from Joe Root, England were able to declare for the second time on the stroke of tea on the fourth day, setting India a target of 445 runs for victory. India lost four wickets in the evening session, before Moeen Ali rattled through the lower order before lunch on day 5, resulting in India's worst batting display on the tour up to that point. Ali finished with figures of 8/129 for the match, and England won their first Test in 10 attempts.

4th Test

Having won the toss and chosen to bat, India collapsed to 8/4 by the sixth over, and despite fighting knocks from captain MS Dhoni and Ravichandran Ashwin, they were bowled out for 152. England scored 367 in reply, a 215-run lead, including half-centuries from Bell, Buttler and Root. England bowler Stuart Broad suffered a broken nose from a delivery by Varun Aaron and was unable to take any further part in the match. In the second innings, England bowled India out for 161 to win the match by an innings and 54 runs and take a 2–1 lead in the series.

5th Test

England won the toss and elected to field first, and reduced India to 36/5 before lunch. The visitors were 90/9 by the end of the 45th over, but a 58-run partnership for the 10th wicket from Dhoni and Ishant Sharma brought India to 148 by the end of their innings. Dhoni made more than half of India's runs, scoring 82 before he was caught at long leg off Stuart Broad. England achieved 62 runs for no wicket in the 19 overs that remained of day 1, and went on to reach 385/7 by the end of day 2, Root finishing the day unbeaten on 92. Root went on to reach an unbeaten 149 runs, helping England to a total of 486. Rain meant the players took an early lunch on day 3, with India already 9/2. The final eight wickets fell in just 23 overs after play restarted, with Stuart Binny top-scoring on 25 not out. After the match, India were penalised for a slow over rate during the game, with captain Dhoni receiving a 60% fine of his match fee and the rest of the team 30%.

ODI series

1st ODI

2nd ODI

3rd ODI

4th ODI

5th ODI

Only T20I

Statistics

Test series

Batting 
Most runs

Bowling 
Most Wickets

Broadcasters

The 5th Test was the 200th live England Test match to be shown on Sky Sports.

References

External links
 Series page on ESPNcricinfo

2014
2014 in English cricket
International cricket competitions in 2014